Elan Sherod Carr (born November 25, 1968) is an American attorney and politician who served as the Special Envoy for Monitoring and Combating anti-Semitism under President Donald Trump from 2019 to 2021.

Before that appointment, Carr was a deputy district attorney in the Los Angeles County District Attorney's office. In 2014, he was the Republican candidate for the US House of Representatives, losing the general election to Ted Lieu. Carr is also an officer in the Judge Advocate General's Corps in the U.S. Army Reserve and an Iraq War veteran.

Political candidacies
In 2014, Carr ran as a Republican to succeed retiring Congressman Henry Waxman, representing California's 33rd congressional district in the United States House of Representatives. In the heavily Democratic district, his message centered on bipartisan solutions to the country's problems and he spoke about the support he was receiving from Democrats.

In the June nonpartisan blanket primary, he placed first, receiving approximately 21% of the votes cast, defeating all Democratic candidates, who split the Democratic vote in the district.

In the November general election, Carr faced Democratic state senator Ted Lieu.  Lieu defeated Carr, securing 59.2% of the vote to Carr's 40.8%.

In 2016, Carr was a candidate to represent the 5th Supervisorial District on the Los Angeles County Board of Supervisors. Republican donor Sheldon Adelson contributed $100,000 to an independent expenditure political action committee in support of Carr's candidacy. Carr failed to advance in the June primary.

Personal

Carr is of mixed Iraqi Jewish and Ashkenazi Jewish heritage. His grandfather, a descendant of Baghdad religious leader Abdallah Somekh, was prosecuted during Iraqi show trials against Jewish community leaders during the time of the founding of the state of Israel.

During Carr's Iraq War service, he led U.S soldiers in lighting a Hanukkah menorah in Saddam Hussein's presidential palace.

Carr's mother and stepfather are immigrants to the United States.  His mother fled from Iraq to Israel, while his stepfather fled from Nazi-occupied Bulgaria to pre-independence Israel. Both later immigrated to the United States.  His biological father is second generation Irish and Italian descent.

Carr earned his bachelor's degree in philosophy and political science at the University of California, Berkeley and his J.D. degree at Northwestern University. He previously served as international president of the Alpha Epsilon Pi fraternity.

He and his wife Dahlia, a physician, met when they were introduced by a mutual friend hosting a Jewish singles event.

|-

References

External links
Official biography at United States Department of State

1968 births
Living people
American lawyers
United States Army officers
American people of Iraqi-Jewish descent
American people of Israeli descent
People from Manhattan
Northwestern University Pritzker School of Law alumni
UC Berkeley College of Letters and Science alumni
Stuyvesant High School alumni
California Republicans